Acryloyl chloride, also known as 2-propenoyl chloride or acrylic acid chloride, is the organic compound with the formula CH2=CHCO(Cl). It is a colorless liquid, although aged samples appear yellow. Although it belongs to the acid chlorides group of compounds, its synthesis and reactivity are somewhat different.

Preparation
Acryloyl chloride can be prepared by treating acrylic acid with acid chlorides, originally benzoyl chloride.  Conventional one-pot chlorinating agents, e.g. thionyl chloride, phosphorus trichloride, are ineffective.  Flow conditions allows use of a broadened range of chlorinating agents including oxalyl chloride and thionyl chloride.

Reactions
This compound undergoes the reactions common for acid chlorides.  For example, it reacts readily with water, producing acrylic acid.  When treated with sodium salts of carboxylic acids, the anhydride is formed. Reactions with alcohols and amines gives esters and amides, respectively.  
Acryloyl chloride is most commonly employed for the introduction of acrylic groups into other compounds, e.g. the preparation of acrylate monomers and polymers.

Toxicity

Symptoms of exposure
Symptoms of Acryloyl Chloride Exposure may be high irritation of the skin, eyes, mucous membranes, and respiratory tract. Lacrimation (tearing) is common. Coughing and difficulty in breathing may be noted along with pulmonary edema in more severe exposures. Other signs and symptoms of acute exposure may include headache, dizziness, and weakness. Gastrointestinal effects may include nausea, vomiting, and diarrhea.

References

See also
 Methacryloyl chloride
 List of extremely hazardous substances

Acyl chlorides
Monomers
Lachrymatory agents
Vinyl compounds